Leipzig is a hamlet in Reford Rural Municipality No. 379, Saskatchewan, Canada. It previously held the status of a village until February 1, 1984. The hamlet is located 27 km south of the town of Wilkie on  highway 657.

The village site houses the Leipzig Convent building; originally built as a convent and boarding schooling; the building now houses Prairie Sky Recovery Centre.

History
Prior to February 1, 1984, Leipzig was incorporated as a village, and was restructured as a hamlet under the jurisdiction of the Rural municipality of Reford that date.

See also
St. Joseph's Colony, Saskatchewan
List of communities in Saskatchewan
Hamlets of Saskatchewan

References

Reford No. 379, Saskatchewan
Former villages in Saskatchewan
Unincorporated communities in Saskatchewan
Populated places disestablished in 1984
Division No. 13, Saskatchewan